Lampadaria is a genus of flowering plants belonging to the family Gesneriaceae.

Its native range is Guyana.

Species:
 Lampadaria rupestris Feuillet & L.E.Skog

References

Gesnerioideae
Gesneriaceae genera